is a city located in Mie Prefecture, Japan. , the city had an estimated population of 88,895 in 40,620 households and a population density of 160 persons per km².

Geography
Iga is located in northwestern Mie Prefecture. The northeastern part of the city is in the Suzuka Mountains,  and the northwestern part is in the Shigaraki Plateau. The southwestern of the city is the Yamato Highlands, and the southeastern portion is a basin surrounded by the Nunobiki Mountains. The area is very hilly. Since it is on the upper reaches of the Kizu River, which belongs to the Yodo River system, and borders on Shiga, Nara, and Kyoto prefectures, although Mie prefecture is classified as part of the Tōkai region, the Iga region, including Nabari city, is designated as part of the Kansai region.

Neighboring municipalities 
Mie Prefecture
 Kameyama
 Tsu
 Nabari
Shiga Prefecture
 Kōka
Kyoto Prefecture
 Minamiyamashiro
Nara Prefecture
 Nara
 Yamazoe

Climate 
Iga has a Humid subtropical climate (Köppen Cfa) characterized by warm summers and cool winters with light to no snowfall.

Demographics
Per Japanese census data, the population of Iga has remained relatively constant over the past 60 years.

History 
The area around the modern city of Iga corresponds to a portion of ancient Iga Province. The area was noted in the Sengoku period as one of the centers for ninjutsu. The town developed in the Edo period under the Tokugawa Shogunate as a castle town under Iga Ueno Castle. Iga is known as the birthplace of the haiku poet Matsuo Bashō and the home of the ninja Hattori Hanzō.

The town of  Ueno was established on April 1, 1889 with the creation of the modern municipalities system. It was raised to city status on September 10, 1941. On November 1, 2004 Ueno merged with the towns of Iga and Ayama, the villages of Shimagahara and Ōyamada (all from Ayama District); and the town of Aoyama (from Naga District) to form the city of Iga.

Government
Iga has a mayor-council form of government with a directly elected mayor and a unicameral city council of 22 members. Iga contributes two members to the Mie Prefectural Assembly. In terms of national politics, the city is part of Mie 3rd district of the lower house of the Diet of Japan.

Economy
Iga is traditionally known as a center for Kumihimo, a traditional braiding art, with several artisans still in activity. The city is a regional commercial center and the local economy is dominated by agriculture and seasonal tourism. Since Iga is geographically located between Osaka and Nagoya, the number of factories located along the Meihan National Highway is increasing, especially due to the convenience of logistics.

Education 
Iga has 19 public elementary schools and ten public middle schools operated by the city government and three public high schools operated by the Mie Prefectural Department of Education.  The city also has two private high schools and one combined private middle/high school.

International schools
 Colégio Positivo - Brazilian primary school

Transportation

Railway 
 JR West –  Kansai Main Line
  -  -  -  - 
 JR West –  Kusatsu Line
 
 Kintetsu Railway  – Osaka Line
  -  -  - 
 Iga Railway – Iga Line
 -  -  -  -  -  -  -  -  -  -  -  -  -

Highway 
 Meihan Expressway

Local attractions 
Two of Iga's main tourist attractions are the Iga Ueno Castle and the Iga-ryū Ninja Museum (the area around the city being the historical home of the famous Iga Ninja). There is also an annual Iga Ueno Ninja Festa ninja festival (April 1 to May 6).

Other not so well known attractions include:
 Otogitoge Pass is one pass that Tokugawa Ieyasu passed over as he hurriedly crossed Iga to return to Okazaki, helped along by the people of Iga and Koka, during the Honnoji War. 
 Momochi Fortress is the fortress of Momochi Tanbanomikami, who is said to be one of the three great ninja, and nearby is Seiunzenji, where his grave is located. 
 Sainenji Temple is a Jodoshu (Pure Land) temple and is the burial place of Fujibayashi Samujiyasutake, the author of one of the great books of ninjutsu, "Bansenshukai".
 Fujiwara no Chikata Kutsu is the castle of Fujiwara no Chikata who appears in the Taiheiki, or Records of Great Peace.
 A statue of Sonic the Hedgehog which was erected in the 1990s for a Sega World location in Kadoma. The statue's owner died, and it is now owned by their children. It was deteriorating until 2020, when the owners finally restored it.

International relations 
   - Jurong, Jiangsu, China

Notable people from Iga 
 Igano Kabamaru, ninja
 Wasabi Mizuta, voice author
 Kazuhiro Yamaji, actor, voice actor
 Akiko Iwasaki, immunologist and professor at Yale University
 Jirō Kawasaki, politician
 Hakaru Hashimoto, medical scientist
 Matsuo Bashō, poet
 Kippei Shiina, actor
 Chiyonokuni Toshiki, sumo wrestler
 Ichizo Nakata, professional soccer player
 Koji Nishimura, professional soccer player
 Genichi Mitsuhashi, first Ninja studies graduate

See also 

 Iga-ryū, the Iga ninja school of ninjutsu

References

External links 

  
 
 

Cities in Mie Prefecture
Iga, Mie